Chile con queso (Spanish for "chile with cheese"), sometimes simply called queso, is an appetizer or side dish of melted cheese and chili peppers, typically served in Tex-Mex restaurants as a dip for tortilla chips.

Background
Chile con queso (also spelled chili con queso) is a part of Tex-Mex and Southwestern cuisine, originating in the northern Mexican state of Chihuahua as a version of Queso chihuahua and Queso flameado. Chile con queso is predominantly found on the menus of Tex-Mex restaurants in the southwest and western United States.

Ingredients
Chile con queso is a smooth, creamy sauce, used for dipping, that is made from a blend of melted cheeses (often Velveeta or another processed cheese, Monterey Jack or cream cheese), cream, and chili peppers. Many restaurants serve chile con queso with such added ingredients as pico de gallo, black beans, guacamole, and ground beef or pork.

Serving
Chile con queso is a warm dish, heated to a desired temperature. Chile con queso can be eaten with tortillas, tortilla chips, or pita chips which are thicker than regular tortilla chips. It can also be used as a condiment on fajitas, tacos, enchiladas, migas, quesadillas or any other Tex-Mex dish.

While Tex-Mex restaurants often offer chips and salsa free of charge, queso is usually offered for an additional charge. It can be made with various cheeses. Usually it is white or yellow in color.

Although chile con queso is commonly called "queso", it should not be confused with "cheese dip," which is specifically cheese without the peppers.

See also

 Cheese sauce
 Chips and dip
 Enchirito
 Fajita
 List of dips
 List of hors d'oeuvre
 Tex-Mex cuisine
 Queso Chihuahua
 Queso flameado
 Nachos

References

External links 

Appetizers
Cheese dishes
Chili pepper dishes
Cuisine of the Southwestern United States
Dips (food)
Mexican cuisine
New Mexican cuisine
Tex-Mex cuisine